Czeladź is a town in Zagłębie Dąbrowskie (part of historic Lesser Poland), in southern Poland, near Katowice and Sosnowiec. Located in the Silesian Highlands, on the Brynica river (tributary of the Vistula), it is the oldest urban center of Zagłębie Dąbrowskie. The area of Czeladź is 16 km2, and it borders Będzin, Sosnowiec, Katowice and Siemianowice Śląskie.

The town is situated in the Silesian Voivodeship since its formation in 1999, previously it was in Katowice Voivodeship. Czeladź is one of the cities of the 2,7 million conurbation – Katowice urban area and within a greater Silesian metropolitan area populated by about 5,294,000 people. The population of the town as of December 2021 is 30,732. Founded in the 13th century, Czeladź was granted city status in 1262. In the years 1434–1790, it belonged to the Duchy of Siewierz. In the 19th century, Czeladź became an important mining center, with the Saturn coal mine opened there in the late 19th century. It also was a main center of Jewish culture, destroyed in The Holocaust.

History
First historic mention of Czeladź comes from 1228, in a bill of Duke Casimir I of Opole, in which the boundaries of the village were mentioned, a public house, as well as a bridge over the Brynica. In 1243, the village (spelled as Celad, and already having the status of a defensive gord) was mentioned again, this time in a document of Duke Konrad I of Masovia, as it had been destroyed in 1241, during the first Mongol invasion of Poland. It belonged to an abbey from Staniątki, and in 1260, Prince Władysław of Opole decided to purchase the village with its parish church. Two years later, Czeladź was sold to an abbey from Henryków, and was granted Magdeburg rights. The town remained within territory of Silesian duchies, but at the same time, Czeles, as it was known, was under the jurisdiction of bishops of Kraków. In 1434 it became part of the Duchy of Siewierz, a property of Kraków Bishops. The town had a defensive wall, remains of which were discovered in 2006, and a town hall, where on March 9, 1589, the agreement between Poles and Austrians was signed, ending the War of the Polish Succession. Czeladź suffered much damage inflicted by the Swedes in the Deluge (1655–60).

In 1790, the Duchy of Siewierz was incorporated directly into the Polish–Lithuanian Commonwealth, and King Stanisław August Poniatowski made Czeladź a free city. After the Partitions of Poland, Czeladź since 1815 belonged to the Russian-controlled Congress Poland, and was located on the border with Kingdom of Prussia's province of Silesia. During the January Uprising, in February 1863, Czeladź was briefly captured by Polish insurgents after their victory in the Battle of Sosnowiec nearby. Since the 1860s, the town began to turn into an industrial center. Two coal mines were opened – Czeladź (1870), and Saturn (1880). Workers' settlements were built, and the dynamic growth was not stopped by World War I, when Czeladź was occupied by the German Empire. In 1915, a power plant was opened, and Czeladź became a magnet for farmers from overpopulated Lesser Poland's villages, who came here in search of work. Tenement houses replaced wooden huts, streets were paved and parks opened. Mining emerged as an engine of town's development, and in the Polish People's Republic, Czeladź kept its industrial position. Coal resources, however, became depleted and mines, starting in the 1960s, would make their workers redundant. Since the notion of unemployment did not officially exist in a Communist country, new companies were opened for the dismissed miners – Transport Company Transbud (1969), Energy Company Energopol (1970), and Window Manufacturer Erg (1971).

Following the joint German-Soviet invasion of Poland, which started World War II in September 1939, the town was occupied by Germany until 1945. In September 1939, the German Einsatzgruppe I entered the town and would commit various atrocities against the population. Nearly all of Czeladź' Jewish community was murdered during the occupation. Jews numbered around 1,000, about 5% of the population, at the beginning of the war. The German invasion led to the immediate abuse, robbery, and murder of Jewish residents. 22 Polish policemen and 15 Polish military officers from Czeladź were murdered by the Russians in the large Katyn massacre in April–May 1940. In June 1940, both Poles and Polish Jews were forced to go to the town square where they were beaten and tortured as retaliation for the murder of a German.  Afterwards, 20 of the Jews were detained and murdered. Polish hostages from Czeladź were among 20 Poles massacred by the Germans on July 16, 1940, in Olkusz. In 1941, the Germans forced Jews into a ghetto. Periodically, some were sent to forced labor camps. In May 1942, 200 residents of the ghetto were sent to Auschwitz. Most sent to Auschwitz were immediately murdered or died later from starvation, disease, and brutality.  In May, 1943, the ghetto was "liquidated" with the last Jews sent to Będzin and then on to Auschwitz.  Only 40 Czeladź Jews are thought to have survived Auschwitz, the labor camps, or by hiding in the area. The Germans also established and operated three forced labor subcamps (E580, E587, E754) of the Stalag VIII-B/344 prisoner-of-war camp in the town. In 1944, the Germans sent kidnapped Polish children from Czeladź to the Potulice concentration camp.

In the mid-1970s, a number of blocks of flats was built in Czeladź, to accommodate an influx of workers employed at the construction of Katowice Steelworks.

Sights
Among points of interest there are:
 Romanesque Revival church of St. Stanislaus Bishop and Martyr, with the 1637 organs and 17th century chalices,
 medieval structure of the center of the town,
 former Polish Brethren church (first half of the 17th century),
 houses from the 18th and 19th centuries,
 historic miners’ settlement in the district of Piaski,
 neo-Classicistic palace Pod Filarami (1924).

Transport
The Polish National roads 86 and 94 run through the town, and several other national roads and the A1 and A4 highways run nearby, within the metropolitan area.

Sports
It competes in the lower leagues.

Notable people
Aryeh Tzvi Frumer (1884–1943), Rav of Koziegłowy
Shlomo Sztencl (1884–1919), Rav of the town in 1905–1910
Abraham Nahum Stencl (1897–1983), Ashkenazi poet
Czesław Słania (1921–2005), postage stamp engraver
Jan Dydak (1968–2019), boxer, Olympic medalist

Twin towns – sister cities

Czeladź is twinned with:
 Auby, France
 Várpalota, Hungary
 Viesīte, Latvia
 Zhydachiv, Ukraine

References

External links

 Jewish Community in Czeladź on Virtual Shtetl

 
Cities and towns in Silesian Voivodeship
Będzin County